is a Japanese trading card arcade game by Konami, released in March 2012. A manga adaptation was serialized in Shogakukan's CoroCoro Comic from June 2012 to February 2015. It was followed by a sequel series called Maō Da Ze! Oreca Battle from March 2015 to January 2016. An anime adaptation aired between April 7, 2014 and March 30, 2015 alongside Dragon Collection, another Konami video game adaptation.  Like Dragon Collection, Oreca Battle has no ending theme and only an opening theme and with all its credits incorporated into the opening theme which is a hallmark for some anime that premiered on TV Asahi in Japan.

Characters

Episode list
Oreca card battles are one of the worlds most exciting contests. The kids love the game. One day, however, the characters on the cards mysteriously disappear. However one boy, Fire Orega, sees the cards appear in the real world and notices they are beginning to cause problems. Only by approaching a mysterious Oreca named Pandora can Fire hope to restore the cards to their normal forms, but it means he'll have to participate in real life Oreca Battles to do so.

Opening theme
 "Oreca Omaeka Genkai Battle!!" by Akira Kushida

References

External links
  
 Official anime website 
 

2012 video games
Arcade video games
Arcade-only video games
Digital collectible card games
Japanese children's animated action television series
Japanese children's animated fantasy television series
Konami games
OLM, Inc.
Shogakukan manga
Shōnen manga
TV Tokyo original programming
Video games scored by Yasunori Nishiki
Xebec (studio)
Video games developed in Japan